Kerguelenella is a genus of air-breathing sea snails, marine pulmonate gastropod mollusks in the family Siphonariidae, the false limpets.

Distribution
Species in this genus live in Patagonia, South Georgia, Kerguelen Islands, Macquarie Islands, and New Zealand's Stewart island and sub-Antarctic islands.

Species
Species within the genus Kerguelenella include:
 Kerguelenella innominata (Iredale, 1915)
 Kerguelenella lateralis (Gould, 1846)
 Kerguelenella stewartiana (Powell, 1939)

References

Further reading 
 Powell A. W. B., New Zealand Mollusca, William Collins Publishers Ltd, Auckland, New Zealand 1979 

Siphonariidae